Triq il-Wiesgħa Tower, originally known as Torre della Giddida and also called Mwejġel Tower ( or ), is a small watchtower near Żabbar, Malta. It was built in 1659 as the ninth of the De Redin towers. The tower suffered extensive damage in the 20th century, with parts of the structure being demolished, but it was restored between 2008 and 2009 and it is now in good condition.

History
Triq il-Wiesgħa Tower was built in 1659 on the shore east of the Grand Harbour. Its name means "Wide Street", because of the wide stretch of coastline it had to defend. It follows the standard design of the De Redin towers, having a square plan with two floors and a turret on the roof. Triq il-Wiesgħa Tower had Santa Maria delle Grazie Tower in its line of sight to the west, and Żonqor Tower to the east, but these no longer exist as they were both demolished by the British military.

The fort was on high ground and Triq il-Wiesgħa Tower did not fall in its line of fire. Had the tower fell within the line of fire, it would have most probably been demolished, as was done in other cases such as Delimara Tower and Bengħisa Tower, which were demolished to clear the lines of fire of Fort Delimara and Fort Benghisa respectively.

By the early 20th century, the rear part of the tower had collapsed and the tower was in ruins, but it was restored in the 1930s. The tower's parapet and turret were removed in World War II, and pillboxes were built in its vicinity. The tower was further damaged when an aircraft crashed nearby.

Present day

After the war, the tower fell again into a state of disrepair, with part of its foundations having collapsed. In 2004, it was handed to Fondazzjoni Wirt Artna. Restoration began four years later in September 2008, and was complete by March 2009. During the restoration, the features removed during World War II were also rebuilt.

Further reading
Info

References

External links

National Inventory of the Cultural Property of the Maltese Islands

De Redin towers
Towers completed in 1659
Żabbar
National Inventory of the Cultural Property of the Maltese Islands
1659 establishments in Malta